Gheorghe Cornea is a former professional football player of Romanian nationality converted into a professional football coach. He was born on July 7, 1967 in the Romanian city of Târgu Jiu.

Professional football career
Cornea played professional football in Romania and Morocco, his best season involved scoring 14 goals for Oţelul Galaţi in the 1994–95 Divizia A season.

In addition he has been selected several times in the national team of Romania.

 Fotbal Club Oțelul Galați (Romania)
 Asociația Clubul de Fotbal Gloria 1922 Bistrița (Romania)
 Fotbal Club Brașov (Romania)
 Asociația Clubul de Fotbal Gloria 1922 Bistrița (Romania)
 Maghreb Association sportive de Fès (Morocco)
 Hassania Union Sport d'Agadir (Morocco)

Professional coach career

Gheorghe Cornea is a very rich professional coach. He has worked in Africa, the Middle East and of course Europe.

He trained in the best leagues in these regions, and had many great players under his supervision.

He has not only been a club coach, but he has also trained national teams.

He was also Technical Director in some of the clubs where he worked.

 2004-2005 : Minerul Certej (Romania)

Coach of the professional team

 2005-2006 : CS Mureșul Deva (Romania)

Coach of the professional team

 2006-2008 : Hassania Union Sport d'Agadir (Morocco)

Coach of the U-21 football team

 2008-2009  : Al Shabab Riyadh (Kingdom of Saudi Arabia)

Coach of the professional team

 2008-2009  : Al Shabab Riyadh (Kingdom of Saudi Arabia)

Assistant Coach of the professional team

 September 2009-December 2009  : Al Nasr Salalah (Oman)

Assistant Coach of the professional team

 January 2010-May 2010  : Al-Taawoun Football Club (Kingdom of Saudi Arabia)

Assistant Coach of the professional team

 2010-2011  : CS CFR Simeria (Romania)

Coach of the professional team

 August 2011-December 2011  : Ohod Club (Kingdom of Saudi Arabia)

Coach of the professional team

 January 2012-June 2012  : Al-Taawoun Football Club (Saudi Arabia)

Coach of the professional team

 2012-2013  : AFC Fortuna Poiana Campina (Romania)

Coach of the professional team

 2013-2014  : Hassania Union Sport d'Agadir (Morocco)

Technical Director

 2014-2016  : U-18 Romania National Team

National Team Coach of the U-18 national team

 July 2016-January 2017  : Qatar Sports Club (Qatar)

Assistant Coach of the professional team

 2017-2018   : CNS Cetate Deva (Romania)

Coach of the professional team

 2018-2019: Al-Shorta El-Gadarif (Sudan)

Coach of the professional team

 2019-   : Al-Hazm Rass (Kingdom of Saudi Arabia)

Assistant Coach of the professional team

Honors

 As a Coach:
 U21 Champion of Morocco 2008
 Vice champion of Saudi Arabia 2010
 Promote in Saudi Arabia Premier League 2010
 As a player:
 Champion of Morocco with Hassania Union Sport d'Agadir
 Champion of Romania
 Winner of the Cup of Romania

Personal life

Gheorghe Cornea speaks fluently Romanian, French and English. He also can understand Arabic.

Degrees and Titles

 UEFA Football Coach License recognized by FIFA
 Engineer's degree in metallurgy
 Member of the Football Commission of the Romanian Football Federation

References

1967 births
Living people
Romanian footballers
Association footballers not categorized by position
ASC Oțelul Galați players
Sportspeople from Târgu Jiu